BYB Extreme Fighting Series (BYB) is a bare knuckle fighting organization founded in 2015 by former MMA fighter Dhafir ("Dada 5000") Harris and former NASCAR team owner Mike Vazquez whose HRT Motorsports was NASCAR's first Hispanic team. Harris rose to fame from his staging of backyard bare knuckle fights which went viral online and subsequently became the subject of the Billy Corben documentary, Dawg Fight. BYB is an abbreviation of "Back Yard Brawl," a nod to the company's origins. BYB's fights are held in it patented "Trigon" ring or cage, which it touts as the smallest fighting surface in combat sports.

History 
BYB announced that its premiere event, Battleship I – originally scheduled to take place aboard the deck of the Resorts World Bimini Superfast – would air on June 5, 2015, shortly after Dawg Fight premiered on Netflix. The event was scrapped from the cruise ship with the organization citing inclement weather, and subsequently held indoors at an undisclosed location in Miami.

BYB went on hiatus following Dada 5000's return to the ring at Bellator 149.  The promotion would host BYB 2: Brawl for it All in Cheyenne, Wyoming on April 5, 2019, at Cheyenne Ice & Event Center. That event started the current run of numbered BYB events in states including Florida and Mississippi, as well as internationally in London.

Events

Partnership with BKB 
In November 2021, BYB announced a talent exchange partnership with UK-based BKB in which each promotion sends fighters overseas to be featured on the other's cards. The series kicked off at BYB 8 with BKB's Barrie Jones knocking out BYB's Luis Melo in the first round.   Through 2022, the companies have hosted 15 trans-continental bare knuckle matchups.

On October 16, 2022, the event featured a mix of BYB vs. BYB, BKB vs. BKB, and BYB vs. BKB fights.  The show featured a number of firsts including the first sanctioned professional female bare knuckle fight in UK history (Jamie Driver def. Sonya Dreiling), the first female title match in UK history (Jozette Cotton def. Miranda Barber for the BYB Super Welterweight and Police Gazette Diamond Belt), and Seth Shaffer defeated Carlos Guerra to win the inaugural BYB Welterweight title as well as the Police Gazette Diamond Belt. The event was broadcast live on Stadium.

Trigon 
In 2015, BYB and its parent company Lights Out Productions filed for a patent on its triangular shaped ring and cage, which they note is the smallest in combat sports.  The patent was granted on December 19, 2017.

In 2021, Triller announced that it would host Triad Combat in a triangular ring. BYB in turn filed a lawsuit against alleging copyright infringement.

Staff 
BYB boasts and number of high profile personalities on its broadcast team including former UFC commentator Mike Goldberg, 2-time boxing champion Paulie Malignaggi, Benny Ricardo, Claudia Trejos, Al Bernstein and Dave Ryan.  Former fighter Erin Toughill serves as a digital host. Longtime WWE producer Nelson Sweglar is BYB's broadcast producer. In September 2019, BYB announced the hiring of Gregory Bloom as CEO.

Vazquez, Harris and matchmaker Mel Valenzuela were each inductees into the Bare Knuckle Boxing Hall of Fame's class of 2022. BYB champions Tony Lopez and Paty Juarez were also honored during the 2022 celebration.

See also  
 Bare Knuckle Fighting Championship
 List of boxing organisations

References

External links  
  

Bare-knuckle boxing
Martial arts organizations